Burbank station is a DART light rail station located near Dallas Love Field airport for service on the  and . The station opened as part of the Green Line's expansion in December 2010, and serves the headquarters for Southwest Airlines and an adjacent residential neighborhood.

This station was originally proposed to serve the airport terminal directly with an underground station (much like Cityplace/Uptown station), but a 2004 study showed that costs would be well beyond acceptable levels and jeopardize a federal grant. The City of Dallas officials and transit agency agreed to a nearby surface-level station on March 12, 2007. Because of this, the station was originally known as Love Field station during construction. In 2010 Inwood/Love Field station was designated for bus service to the airport.

Signage at the station still purports a future connection to Love Field.

References

External links 
Dallas Area Rapid Transit - Burbank Station

Dallas Area Rapid Transit light rail stations in Dallas
Railway stations in the United States opened in 2010
Dallas Love Field
Railway stations in Dallas County, Texas